Blå blå känslor is a 2014 album by Swedish band, Drifters.

Track listing
Jag räknar ner
Here You Come Again
Blå blå känslor
Ingen av oss förstår
Du bara du
Måndag morgon
Smultron på ett strå (summertime version)
Louisiana
Det är kanske försent
Böna och be
Lugn efter en storm (Calm After the Storm)
You Can't Love Me Too Much
Nu ser jag livet genom tårar
Mitt hjärta finns kvar här ändå

Charts

References 

2014 albums
Drifters (Swedish band) albums
Swedish-language albums